Ewa Wasilewska also known as Ewa Borkowska, Ewa Justyna Borkowska or Ewa Borkowska-Wasilewska is a former Polish female speed skater. She competed at the 1992 Winter Olympics and in the 1994 Winter Olympics representing Poland.

References

External links
 

1967 births
Living people
Polish female speed skaters
Olympic speed skaters of Poland
Speed skaters at the 1992 Winter Olympics
Speed skaters at the 1994 Winter Olympics
People from Giżycko
Sportspeople from Warmian-Masurian Voivodeship